The second-term curse is the perceived tendency of second terms of U.S. presidents to be less successful than their first terms.

According to the curse, the second terms of U.S. presidents have usually been plagued by a major scandal, policy inertia, some sort of catastrophe, or other problems. There have been twenty-one U.S. presidents who have served a second term, each of whom has faced difficulties attributed to the curse. The legend behind the second-term curse is that after Franklin D. Roosevelt broke the de facto second term limit by running for third and fourth terms, the ghost of George Washington might have put a curse on any president who seeks a second term. This legend notwithstanding, several presidents who served prior to this, including Washington and Roosevelt themselves, were plagued by problems in their second term more serious than in their first.

Whether this perceived tendency is real is a subject of dispute: for example, political statistician Nate Silver, after analyzing presidential approval ratings for Harry S. Truman through Barack Obama, did find that approval ratings were lower on average during second terms, but he also found a variety of other reasons to explain those ratings, such as regression toward the mean, and he concluded that "the idea of the second-term curse is sloppy as an analytical concept". In addition, political writer Michael Barone cited several presidents who had successful second terms, and wrote that "second-term problems resulted more often from the failure to adjust to changed circumstances and unanticipated challenges". Conversely, a 2013 report in The Economist has said that the existence of the second-term curse is supported by data. The report stated  that each of the eleven second terms served from the beginning of the Theodore Roosevelt administration to the end of the George W. Bush administration were less economically prosperous than their respective president's first term, save for the second terms of Truman, Ronald Reagan, and Bill Clinton. However, these findings could be due to the effect of survivorship bias; presidents who are elected for a second term are more likely to have had a good first term, making their second term look worse by comparison.

Presidents of the curse

See also
 Curse of Tippecanoe

Notes

References 

Curses
Presidency of the United States
Political terminology of the United States
United States presidential history